Jahliyan Rural District is a rural district (dehestan) in the Central District of Konarak County, in Sistan and Baluchestan province, Iran. At the 2006 census, its population was 13,629, in 2,723 families.  The rural district has 32 villages.

References 

Rural Districts of Sistan and Baluchestan Province
Konarak County